Jessica Dimmock (born June 23, 1978) is a documentary photojournalist and filmmaker based in Brooklyn, New York City. Her body of work, The Ninth Floor, documented the lives of a group of young heroin users over the course of several years.

Education and career
Dimmock is a 2005 graduate of the program in documentary photography and photojournalism at the International Center of Photography.  She shoots regularly for the New York Times Magazine, Fortune, Newsweek and other U.S. magazines. She has been profiled in New York magazine, Aperture, Photo District News, and the British Journal of Photography.  She is a member of VII Photo Agency.

She began her "Ninth Floor" project in late 2004 in Manhattan.  A drug dealer noticed her camera, approached her on the street, and invited her to take photographs of him. He led Dimmock to a building in the Flatiron District, where Dimmock spent eight months photographing the approximately 30 heroin addicts who shared an apartment. In June 2005, the owners of the apartment evicted the addicts, but Dimmock continued to photograph two of the couples for more than two years after the eviction. The project was published as a video and as a book in 2007.

Publications

Publications by Dimmock
The Ninth Floor. Rome: Contrasto, 2007.

Publications with contributions by Dimmock
American Photography 22. AI-AP, 2006.
Flash Forward. Toronto: Magenta Foundation, 2006.
This Day of Change. Tokyo: Kodansha, 2009.
A New American Photographic Dream. Milan: Silvana, 2010.

Films
Jessica Dimmock: The Ninth Floor (2007) – video
Paparazzi (2010) – short film
Wait for Me (2011) – music video
Without (2011) – documentary feature film, producer, cinematographer
The Pearl - documentary feature; co-director, cinematographer
The Convention – documentary short film; producer, director, cinematographer

Exhibitions
2008: The Ninth Floor, Foley Gallery, New York City
2008: The Ninth Floor, Randall Scott Gallery, Washington, DC
2008: Under Influence - Intoxication and Drugs in Contemporary Art (group show), Kunsthaus Dresden, Germany
2008: Dispatches From the Frontlines (group show), Fovea Exhibitions, Beacon, New York
2008: The Ninth Floor, Foam Fotografiemuseum Amsterdam
2009: The Ninth Floor, Locuslux Gallery, Belgium
2009: The Ninth Floor, International Documentary Film Festival Amsterdam
2009: Viewing Restricted: [Re]presenting Poverty (group show), London School of Economics, London
 2010: The Brothel Without Walls (group show), University of Toronto Art Centre for the Scotiabank Contact Photography Festival, Toronto

Awards
2006: Magnum Photos' Inge Morath Award for Photojournalism
2006: F Award, Fabrica Forma Fotografia
2008: New York Photo Award in "multimedia photo/audio" category
2010: Finalist, Best Photography Book Award, Sixty-Seventh Annual Pictures of the Year International Competition
2016: Grand Jury Prize for Best Documentary Feature, Dallas International Film Festival, with Christopher LaMarca for The Pearl
2017: Third prize, Long Form category, World Press Photo, for The Convention

References

External links

1978 births
American photojournalists
Living people
American women photographers
VII Photo Agency photographers
People from Brooklyn
21st-century American women
Women photojournalists